The Oi Rio Pro 2018 was an event of the 2018 World Surf League. It was held from 11 to 20 May at Saquarema, Rio de Janeiro, Brazil, and contested by 36 surfers.

Round 1

Round 2

Round 3

Round 4

Quarter finals

Semi finals

Final

References

2018 World Surf League
Rio Pro
Oi Rio Pro
Oi Rio Pro 2018
Oi Rio Pro 2018
Oi Rio Pro 2018